UPRA may refer to:

 Ukrainian People's Revolutionary Army
 University of Puerto Rico at Aguadilla
 University of Puerto Rico at Arecibo